Zbigniew Wyciszkiewicz  (born 16 September 1969 in Strzelin) is a retired Polish professional footballer who played for Widzew Łódź and ŁKS Łódź in the Polish Ekstraklasa.

Wyciszkiewicz made three appearances for the Poland national football team.

References

 

1969 births
Living people
Polish footballers
Poland international footballers
Polish expatriate footballers
Odra Opole players
Widzew Łódź players
ŁKS Łódź players
Polonia Warsaw players
KSZO Ostrowiec Świętokrzyski players
Royal Antwerp F.C. players
Ekstraklasa players
Belgian Pro League players
Expatriate footballers in Belgium
People from Strzelin
Sportspeople from Lower Silesian Voivodeship
Association football midfielders
Stal Głowno players